Samraong may refer to various places in Cambodia:

Samraong, Banteay Meanchey (commune)
Samraong, Banteay Meanchey (village)
Samraong, Kampong Cham (commune), a commune of Prey Chhor District, Kampong Cham, Cambodia
Samraong District, a district of Oddar Meanchey Province, Cambodia
Samraong (town), the capital of Oddar Meanchey Province, Cambodia
Samraŏng District, a district of Takeo Province, Cambodia